11573 Helmholtz, provisional designation , is a Zhongguo asteroid from the outermost region of the asteroid belt, approximately  in diameter. It was discovered on 20 September 1993, by German astronomers Freimut Börngen and Lutz Schmadel at the Karl Schwarzschild Observatory in Tautenburg, Germany. It is one of few asteroids located in the 2:1 resonance with Jupiter. The asteroid was named for German physicist Hermann von Helmholtz.

Orbit and classification 

Helmholtz is a non-family asteroid from the main belt's background population. It is a member of the small group of Zhongguo asteroids, located in the Hecuba gap (2:1 mean motion resonance with Jupiter) near 3.27 AU. Contrary to the nearby unstable Griqua group, the orbits of the Zhongguos are stable over half a billion years.

It orbits the Sun in the outer main-belt at a distance of 2.4–4.1 AU once every 5 years and 11 months (2,148 days; semi-major axis of 3.26 AU). Its orbit has an eccentricity of 0.26 and an inclination of 2° with respect to the ecliptic. The body's observation arc begins at Palomar Observatory in January 1989.

Physical characteristics

Diameter and albedo 

Based on a generic magnitude-to-diameter conversion, Helmholtz measures 13 kilometer in diameter for an absolute magnitude of 13.2 and an assumed albedo of 0.057, which is typical for carbonaceous asteroids. If the body was of stony rather than carbonaceous composition, its estimated diameter would be less than 7 kilometer.

Rotation period 

As of 2018, no rotational lightcurve of Helmholtz has been obtained from photometric observations. The body's rotation period, pole and shape remain unknown.

Naming 

This minor planet was named after German physiologist and physicist Hermann von Helmholtz (1821–1894), a prolific naturalists of the 19th century. The official naming citation was published by the Minor Planet Center on 20 March 2000.  The lunar crater Helmholtz as well as the crater Helmholtz on Mars are also named in his honor.

References

External links 
 Asteroid Lightcurve Database (LCDB), query form (info )
 Dictionary of Minor Planet Names, Google books
 Asteroids and comets rotation curves, CdR – Observatoire de Genève, Raoul Behrend
 Discovery Circumstances: Numbered Minor Planets (10001)-(15000) – Minor Planet Center
 
 

011573
011573
Discoveries by Freimut Börngen
Discoveries by Lutz D. Schmadel
Named minor planets
19930920